HD 193322 (HR 7767) is a group of six stars which appear to be at least loosely bound into a system in the constellation Cygnus. The stars comprise the core of the young open cluster Collinder 419 (Cr 419), which contains a total of 51 known stars. Another prominent member of the cluster is the eclipsing binary star  (HD 228911).

System

HD 193322A

The brightest and most massive component, HD 193322A, is a triple star system and emits 89% of the system's visible light. It is composed of Aa and Ab on an eccentric 44-year orbit. The binary Ab itself consists of stars Ab1 and Ab2 on a  orbit. The total mass of the system HD193233A has been calculated to be , although the individual stellar masses give a smaller total.

HD 193222Aa has spectral class O9Vnn, indicating a main-sequence star with highly-broadened absorption lines due to rapid rotation. HD 193322Ab1 has spectral class O8.5III, although its derived physical properties suggest it may actually be on the main sequence. Its companion HD 193322Ab2 is a main-sequence star of spectral class B2.5. The Ab pair may have a combined mass and brightness greater than Aa.

HD 193322B
HD 193322B is a single B-type main-sequence star separated from HD 193322A by 2.76 arcseconds on the sky, which puts them at least 2,780 astronomical units (AU) apart.  Making several assumptions, the orbital period would be about 11 thousand years. HD 193322B produces 11% of the visible light emitted by the six-star system.

Other components
It is unclear if the two are gravitationally bound to the system. HD 193322D is a suspected Lambda Boötis star.

References

Cygnus (constellation)
Binary stars
B-type main-sequence stars
6
O-type main-sequence stars
7767
193322
100069
BD+40 4103
J20180697+4043554
O-type giants